Pozharishche is a rural locality (a village) in Yavengskoye Rural Settlement, Vozhegodsky District, Vologda Oblast, Russia. The population was 25 as of 2002.

Geography 
Pozharishche is located 19 km north of Vozhega (the district's administrative centre) by road. Novaya is the nearest rural locality.

References 

Rural localities in Vozhegodsky District